The following is a list of awards and nominations received by American actress Susan Sarandon.

Film and television awards

Academy Awards

BAFTA Awards
1 win out of 2 nominations

Emmy Awards

Primetime Emmy Awards

Daytime Emmy Awards

Golden Globe Awards

Golden Raspberry Awards

Satellite Awards

Saturn Awards

Screen Actors Guild Awards

Television Critics Association Awards

Critics awards wins

See also
 Susan Sarandon filmography

References

External links
 

Lists of awards received by American actor